Beverley Rugby Football Club is an English rugby union team based in Beverley, East Riding of Yorkshire. The club runs two senior men's sides, Colts, Ladies and a full set of junior teams. The first XV currently plays in Counties 1 Yorkshire.

History
Beverley RUFC was originally founded in 1883, had a stint a Longcroft Old Boys before reassuming the club's current name in 1965. The club has played in both the North East and Yorkshire divisions of the club rugby union hierarchy. During the mid-2000s the club won four consecutive promotions, moving from Yorkshire 2 to the national level when the club spent the 2007-08 season in the old National 3 North when that division was at the fourth level of club rugby. However, Beverley has suffered two relegations since then, but after one season in North 1 East, they were promoted as champions and spent two seasons in National League 3 North before being relegated back into North 1 East and the following season into Yorkshire 1.

Honours
Yorkshire Silver Trophy winners: 1974–75
Humberside Cup winners (2): 1983–84, 1986–87
Yorkshire Shield winners (3): 1985–86, 1996–97, 2003–04
North East 2 Champions: 1996–97
Yorkshire Division Two champions: 2003–04
Yorkshire Division One champions: 2004–05
North 2 (east v west) promotion playoff winners: 2005-06
North 1 v Midlands 1 promotion playoff winners: 2006–07
North 1 East champions: 2012–13

References

English rugby union teams
Rugby clubs established in 1959
Sport in the East Riding of Yorkshire
Beverley